An-Nasir Ahmad or Al-Nasir Ahmad may refer to:

An-Nasir Ahmad, Sultan of Egypt, the Mamluk sultan of Egypt in 1342
An-Nasir Ahmad (Zaidi imam), the imam of the Zaidi state in Yemen in the 10th century